The 1981–82 Cypriot Second Division was the 27th season of the Cypriot second-level football league. Alki Larnaca FC won their 2nd title.

Format
Fourteen teams participated in the 1981–82 Cypriot Second Division. All teams played against each other twice, once at their home and once away. The team with the most points at the end of the season crowned champions. The first two teams were promoted to 1982–83 Cypriot First Division. The last two teams were relegated to the 1982–83 Cypriot Third Division.

Changes from previous season
Teams promoted to 1981–82 Cypriot First Division
 Evagoras Paphos
 APOP Paphos FC

Teams relegated from 1980–81 Cypriot First Division
 Alki Larnaca FC
 Aris Limassol FC

Teams promoted from 1980–81 Cypriot Third Division
 Kentro Neotitas Maroniton
 Apollon Lympion

Teams relegated to 1981–82 Cypriot Third Division
 Iraklis Gerolakkou
 Neos Aionas Trikomou

League standings

See also
 Cypriot Second Division
 1981–82 Cypriot First Division
 1981–82 Cypriot Cup

References

Cypriot Second Division seasons
Cyprus
1981–82 in Cypriot football